Westringia longifolia, commonly known as long-leaved westringia, is a flowering plant in the family Lamiaceae and is endemic to southeastern Australia. It is a small shrub, with linear leaves and mostly white flowers.

Description
Flowering occurs mostly from July to December

Taxonomy and naming
Westringia longifolia was first formally described in 1810 by Robert Brown and the description was published in Prodromus florae Novae Hollandiae.The specific epithet (longifolia) means "long leaved".

Distribution and habitat
Long-leaves westringia grows in gullies, near streams on sandy or loamy soils north of Mittagong, scattered throughout Sydney and the Central Tablelands.

References 

longifolia
Flora of New South Wales
Taxa named by Robert Brown (botanist, born 1773)
Plants described in 1810
Lamiales of Australia